5-MAPB (1-(benzofuran-5-yl)-N-methylpropan-2-amine) is an entactogenic designer drug similar to MDMA in its structure and effects.

Legal Status

Canada
5-MAPB is not listed itself in the CDSA but since it is structurally related to MDMA it may be considered illegal in Canada, although this has not been tested in court.

China
As of October 2015 5-MAPB is a controlled substance in China.

Luxembourg
As of July 2021, 5-MAPB is not cited in the list of prohibited substances. Therefore, it is still a legal substance.

United Kingdom

5-MAPB was originally banned in the UK in June 2013 under a Temporary class drug order. On March 5, 2014, the UK Home Office announced that 5-MAPB would be made a class B drug on 10 June 2014 alongside every other benzofuran entactogen and many structurally related drugs.

Pharmacokinetics

Metabolism and toxicity
Little formal knowledge exists on 5-MAPB. It does not form the alpha-methyldopamine metabolite that contributes to the neurotoxicity of MDMA or MDA. A study in rats indicated that the major metabolites of 5-MAPB are 5-APB and 3-carboxymethyl-4-hydroxymethamphetamine.

Pharmacodynamics

5-MAPB binds to the dopamine transporter in rat brain cells with a lower affinity than cocaine. In silico data suggests that the primary action on dopamine is through reversal of the transporter to release dopamine. This is consistent with the effects and it is possible that it exerts a similar action on serotonin and norepinephrine transporters.

References 

Methamphetamines
5-Benzofuranethanamines
Designer drugs
Entactogens and empathogens